Kevin Terry is a retired English-American soccer forward and referee who played professionally in the Major Indoor Soccer League, American Soccer League and United Soccer League.  He spent ten seasons as a Major League Soccer and seven years as a FIFA official.

Player
Born in England, Terry moved to the United States when he was fifteen.  In 1979, he signed with the Cleveland Force of the Major Indoor Soccer League.  He played three seasons with the Force.  He later played for the Cleveland Cobras of the American Soccer League and the Oklahoma City Stampede of the United Soccer League.

Referee
In 1986, he became a referee with the Major Indoor Soccer League.  In 1996, Terry became a referee with Major League Soccer.  Before retiring in 2005, he had officiated the 1998 and 2002 MLS Cup.  He also served as a FIFA referee from 1998 to 2004.  In 2002, he was named the MLS Referee of the Year.

References

External links
MISL stats

1958 births
Living people
American soccer coaches
American soccer players
American soccer referees
American Soccer League (1933–1983) players
Cleveland Cobras players
Cleveland Force (original MISL) players
Major Indoor Soccer League (1978–1992) players
Oklahoma City Stampede players
United Soccer League (1984–85) players
Association football forwards
Major League Soccer referees